Birmingham bombing may refer to:
16th Street Baptist Church bombing in Birmingham, Alabama, USA
Birmingham pub bombings in Birmingham, England
2001 Birmingham bombing in Birmingham, England